John Williams (born 1832, date of death unknown) was a Union Navy sailor in the American Civil War and a recipient of the U.S. military's highest decoration, the Medal of Honor, for his actions during the Joint Expedition Against Franklin.

Born in 1832 in Blair County, Pennsylvania, Williams was still living in that county when he joined the Navy. On that day, as the ship steamed down the Blackwater River during the Joint Expedition Against Franklin, Virginia, Williams remained at his post despite heavy fire. For this action, he was awarded the Medal of Honor six months later, on April 3, 1863.

Williams' official Medal of Honor citation reads:
On board the U.S.S. Commodore Perry in the attack upon Franklin, Va., 3 October 1862. With enemy fire raking the deck of his ship and blockades thwarting her progress, Williams remained at his post and performed his duties with skill and courage as the Commodore Perry fought a gallant battle to silence many rebel batteries as she steamed down the Blackwater River.

References 

1832 births
Year of death missing
People from Blair County, Pennsylvania
People of Pennsylvania in the American Civil War
Union Navy sailors
United States Navy Medal of Honor recipients
American Civil War recipients of the Medal of Honor